Man of Action Entertainment (also known as Man of Action Studios) is an American writer collective specializing in various brands of media ranging from television, films, comic books, and animation. The studio is best known for their animated action shows, superhero, live-action films and serial comics, such as Ben 10, Generator Rex,  Gormiti Nature Unleashed and Big Hero 6.

Man of Action was created in 2000. It is owned and operated by comic book writers and artists Duncan Rouleau, Joe Casey, Joe Kelly, and Steven T. Seagle.

List of Man of Action Entertainment works

TV series

Comic/Graphic novels

Video games
Darksiders 3 (2018)
The Quiet Man (2018) (with Square Enix and Human Head Studios)
Metal Slug Tactics (2023)

References

External links
 Official website
 Man of Action on Internet Movie Database

 
2000 establishments in California
American companies established in 2000
American animation studios
Mass media companies established in 2000
Comics publishing companies
Publishing collectives
Companies based in Glendale, California